Lea Bayers Rapp (born July 19, 1946 in Brooklyn) is an American non-fiction and children's fiction writer. Among her books are "Put Your Kid in Show Biz" and "Mazel Tov! The Complete Book of Jewish Weddings." She also wrote for periodicals.

Lea Bayers was born into a Jewish family from Brooklyn. She holds a BA from Thomas Edison State College. In 2011, she lives in Sayreville, New Jersey.

Books

 1978 − Smiling Faces, a musical play for children with music by Claire Martin (Jobete Music Company)
 1981 − Put your kid in show biz (Sterling Publishing)
 1992 − The best public high schools: Where do kids get the best secondary education in New Jersey? (with 4 coauthors; Tomlinson Enterprises)
 1993 − Life's little destruction book (St. Martin's Press)
 2002 − Mazel tov! The complete book of Jewish weddings (Kensington Books)

References

External links 
 Lea Bayers Rapp at Goodreads
 Author website

1946 births
Living people
Jewish American writers
People from Brighton Beach
People from Sayreville, New Jersey
Thomas Edison State University alumni
20th-century American women writers
20th-century American non-fiction writers
21st-century American women writers
American women non-fiction writers
21st-century American non-fiction writers
21st-century American Jews